Kamenica is a small village northeast of Krmelj in the Municipality of Sevnica in central Slovenia. The area is part of the historical region of Lower Carniola. The municipality is now included in the Lower Sava Statistical Region. Until 2001, the settlement included the area of now autonomous settlement of Kamenško.

St. Margaret's Church

The local church built on a small hill southeast of the settlement is dedicated to Saint Margaret and belongs to the Parish of Šentjanž. It was built around 1700 on the site of an earlier building.

References

External links

Kamenica at Geopedia

Populated places in the Municipality of Sevnica